The Coupe de la Ligue Final 2005 was a football match held at Stade de France, Saint-Denis on 30 April 2005, that saw RC Strasbourg Alsace defeat Stade Malherbe Caen 2–1 thanks to goals by Mamadou Niang and Jean-Christophe Devaux.

Match details

See also
2004–05 Coupe de la Ligue

External links
Report on LFP official site

2005
Stade Malherbe Caen matches
RC Strasbourg Alsace matches
2004–05 in French football
April 2005 sports events in France
Sport in Saint-Denis, Seine-Saint-Denis
Football competitions in Paris
2005 in Paris